Colletes longifacies is a species of hymenopteran in the family Colletidae. It is found in North America. The species is one of five from the family Colletidae that are endemic to the state of Florida. The species occurs in North-Central Peninsular Florida and the Panhandle.

References

Further reading

 

Colletidae
Articles created by Qbugbot
Insects described in 1954
Endemic fauna of Florida